Valdemar Costa Neto (born 11 August 1949) is a Brazilian politician. He is a congressman and president for the Liberal Party (PL), the party of the former President of Brazil Jair Bolsonaro

In 2012, he was charged with corruption and money laundering. He was arrested in the same year, but in 2016 he received a pardon by the Supreme Federal Court (STF).

References

1949 births
Living people
People from São Paulo
Liberal Party (Brazil, 2006) politicians
Liberal Party (Brazil, 1985) politicians
National Renewal Alliance politicians
Democratic Social Party politicians
Brazilian politicians convicted of corruption
Members of the Chamber of Deputies (Brazil) from São Paulo
Leaders of political parties in Brazil